The abdication of Emperor Bảo Đại took place on 25 August 1945 and marked the end of the 143-year reign of the Nguyễn dynasty over Vietnam ending the Vietnamese monarchy. Bảo Đại abdicated in response to the August Revolution. A ceremony was held handing power over to the newly established Democratic Republic of Vietnam, which was established during the end of World War II in Asia as Vietnam had been occupied by French and later Japanese imperialists.

After the Việt Minh sent a telegram to the Imperial City of Huế demanding the abdication of Emperor Bảo Đại, he announced that he would abdicate and officially abdicated on 25 August. After a representative of the Việt Minh convinced Bảo Đại to hold a public abdication ceremony he did so on 30 August 1945. The passing of the ceremonial seal and sword had been seen as symbolically "passing the Mandate of Heaven over to the government of the Democratic Republic of Vietnam". Following his abdication Emperor Bảo Đại became "citizen Vĩnh Thụy" (公民永瑞, công dân Vĩnh Thụy) and would become an advisor to the new Democratic Republic of Vietnam government in Hanoi.

After the French returned following the defeat of the Axis powers (Germany, Japan, etc) they attempted to re-install Bảo Đại back on the throne and created the State of Vietnam with him as its Chief of State (國長, Quốc trưởng), the French also oversaw the creation of the Domain of the Crown where he was still officially considered to be the Emperor, this territory existed until 1955.

Background  
 

While in 1945 Vietnam briefly regained its independence from France as the Bảo Đại Emperor rescinded the Patenôtre Treaty ending the French protectorates over Annam and Tonkin creating the Empire of Vietnam, it had become nothing more than a Japanese puppet state. In response to both French and Japanese oppression of the Vietnamese people as well as the Ất Dậu (Wood Cock) famine caused by the war Hồ Chí Minh's Communist Việt Minh (League for the Independence of Vietnam) launched a general uprising against both French and Japanese colonial rule in Vietnam on 14 August 1945. 

According to Nguyễn Kỳ Nam on 12 August 1945 a Japanese general entered the city of Huế and asked to meet with the Minister of Justice Trịnh Đình Thảo saying that there were urgent and confidential matters. At that time, the journalist Nguyễn Kỳ Nam was present because he was General Manager of the Ministry of Justice office in Huế of the Trần Trọng Kim cabinet. He informed the minister that he had come from Saigon, Cochinchina to ask for an audience with the Emperor to ask for permission to deal with the Việt Minh's uprising. 

At the time Emperor Bảo Đại was unaware of the issues that had plagued his country, such as the devastating Wood Cock famine that had killed possibly millions of his subjects in Annam and Tonkin as no contemporary evidence exists of Bảo Đại addressing this major disaster in Vietnamese history. When the Việt Minh sent a telegram demanding the abdication of Bảo Đại from his throne, Phạm Khắc Hoè received the telegram and told Bảo Đại about the demands which surprised him as he wasn't aware of either the revolution or which political actors were behind it. 

The telegram sent by Un comité de patriotes représentant tous les partis et toutes les couches de la population set an ultimatum of 12 hours for Bảo Đại to abdicate, otherwise they couldn't guarantee that he or his family would survive the August Revolution. Bảo Đại claimed that he had attempted to contact the American President Harry S. Truman, Generalissimo Chiang Kai-Shek, King George VI, and General Charles de Gaulle for help but that none of them answered. A young tutor of Crown Prince Nguyễn Phúc Bảo Long begged for Bảo Đại to take shelter in the Imperial Tomb but he refused. Bảo Đại later received a second telegram from Hanoi asking for his abdication. 

It is not known who convinced Emperor Bảo Đại to abdicate, as it might have been Huỳnh Thúc Kháng or Phạm Khắc Hòe. The latter drew a comparison with this situation and the fate of King Louis XVI. 

Emperor Bảo Đại sent the following telegram to the "Comité des Patriotes" (Ủy Ban những người yêu nước) accepting their terms: 

Following the telegram the Việt Minh sent a delegation to Huế to receive the statement of abdication from Emperor Bảo Đại.

Journalist Nguyễn Kỳ Nam claimed that Emperor Bảo Đại personally was aware of the Việt Minh before the revolution and that a Japanese general had alerted him claiming that he had gathered intelligence about the secret organisation of Việt Minh revolutionaries all over the country but that Bảo Đại refused the offer by the Japanese to take down the Communists because he believed that enough bloodshed had already occurred during the war. The writer Nguyễn Văn Lục of the newspaper DCVOnline.net in his article Nhận định về ba vai trò của Bảo Đại: Vua, Cố vấn tối cao, và Quốc trưởng - Phần 4 (Comment on the three roles of Bảo Đại: Sovereign, Supreme Advisor, and Chief of State - Part 4) claimed that Bảo Đại accepted the proposal to abdicate in a calculated decision as he may have had hope that he still had popular support and that the people might have resisted the revolution in his aid.

A French military force entitled "Lambda" consisting of 6 men led by the French captain Castelnat parachuted 28 kilometers from Huế in order to try to prevent Emperor Bảo Đại from abdicating. However, they were captured by the Việt Minh as soon as their parachutes hit the ground.

Official abdication  

The abdication of Emperor Bảo Đại was officially announced on 25 August 1945. The imperial edict ending the Nguyễn dynasty was composed by Emperor Bảo Đại with the help of Prince Nguyễn Phúc Vĩnh Cẩn on the night of 22 August 1945 at the Kiến Trung Palace within the Citadel of Huế. The next morning, when the representatives of the Provisional Revolutionary Government of the Democratic Republic of Vietnam Trần Huy Liệu and Cù Huy Cận came to the palace to receive the documents of resignation, Emperor Bảo Đại at first gave the declaration to Trần Huy Liệu, but Liệu then convinced the Emperor to hold a formal ceremony announcing his abdication. 

Together with his edict declaring his abdication, Emperor Bảo Đại also promulgated an edict which was directed at the imperial family of the Nguyễn dynasty, reminding them of his attachment to the dân vi qúi philosophy and of his vow that he would rather be only a citizen of an independent country than the puppet ruler of an enslaved country. He called on the members of the imperial family to support the government of the Democratic Republic of Vietnam and that they should also work to preserve Vietnam’s independence. Both of these edicts made it clear that Emperor Bảo Đại's will to step aside on behalf of the new government in Hanoi. The edicts also contained the notion that he was unambiguously transmitting his mandate voluntarily rather than under any form of coercion.

The August Revolution was proclaimed to be successful, on 25 August 1945, President Hồ Chí Minh together with the Central Committee of the Communist Party (Trung ương Đảng) and the National Committee for the Liberation of the People (Ủy ban Dân tộc giải phóng) returned to Hanoi. The abdication of Emperor Bảo Đại further symbolised the end of the military government and the beginning of a civilian government for the Democratic Republic of Vietnam. 
 
On the afternoon of 27 August and the morning of 28 August 1945, Phạm Khắc Hòe had an inventory of assets in the imperial Citadel to hand over to the Revolutionary Government of the Democratic Republic of Vietnam. The most valuable items were the historical pearl and ivory objects of the Nguyễn Emperors. These were stored in a large tunnel behind the Palace of Heavenly Purity. Phạm Khắc Hòe would organise the handover ceremony that was to be held on 30 August 1945.

Ceremony  
 

Around 50,000 people attended the ceremony held on 30 August 1945, the ceremony itself was held outside of the Meridian Gate, the main gate to the Imperial City, located within the citadel of Huế. The Meridian Gate was chosen because it is the venue for the most important political events of the Nguyễn dynasty such as the coronation ceremony of a new Emperor (lễ lên ngôi), the awarding of doctorates to high achieving mandarins, the Lunar New Year celebration (Tết Nguyên Đán), the reception of the ambassador of neighbouring countries, Etc. 

During the ceremony Emperor Bảo Đại was dressed his imperial costume (Hoàng bào) and worse a yellow turban. 

According to his memoirs, Bảo Đại read the proclamation while the audience was in complete silence.  According to him everyone present at the ceremony was shocked. He watched the top audience and said that all of them had expressions of great amazement. The men and women present were all bewildered. He stated that the proclamation of his abdication proclamation was like a bolt of lightning hitting them across their heads causing them to instantly freeze. In contrast Trần Huy Liệu claimed in his memoirs that the crowd was cheering in excitement. 

As a part of his official abdication, Emperor Bảo Đại personally gave his regalia to representatives of the government of the Democratic Republic of Vietnam in ceremony. In this ceremony he handed over the Hoàng Đế chi bảo (皇帝之寶) seal weighing around 10 kilograms and the jade-encrusted silver sword (An dân bảo kiếm, known as the "Sword of the State") to the Communist government. The passing of the ceremonial seal and sword had been seen as symbolically "passing the Mandate of Heaven over to the government of the Democratic Republic of Vietnam". 

The three representatives of the Democratic Republic of Vietnam that attended the ceremony to formalise the abdication of Emperor Bảo Đại were Trần Huy Liệu, Nguyễn Lương Bằng, and Cù Huy Cận. During the ceremony Emperor Bảo Đại handed the Hoàng Đế chi bảo over to the 26 year old Trần Huy Liệu, who found it heavy to carry, and the Sword of the State was handed over to Cù Huy Cận. 

After he handed over the sword Emperor Bảo Đại asked the delegation now that he is an ordinary citizen of an independent country if he could also receive something from the delegation to commemorate this event. The delegate was surprised with the request and quickly discussed what to do, Cù Huy Cận improvised and pulled out a red badge with a yellow star that the Thừa Thiên Huế Revolutionary People's Committee gave to members of the Delegation and installed on it on the chest of Bảo Đại, he then loudly proclaimed "Xin đồng bào hoan nghênh công dân Vĩnh Thụy" (Welcome, fellow citizen Vĩnh Thụy).

Emperor Bảo Đại also assigned other imperial objects to be transferred to Trần Huy Liệu and the other delegates such as jade chess pieces outside of the ceremony.

After the delegates had received the ceremonial items they held them up to the people of Huế so they can observe them, Trần Huy Liệu noted how he and the other delegates never held more than a few grams of gold before in their lives and were surprised by how heavy the golden objects were making them exhausted while trying to show them to the people.

Trần Huy Liệu then proceeded to read a speech to the people, in his speech he declared the end of over a millennium of monarchy and the proclamation that the reign of the Nguyễn dynasty has come to an end.

The two men responsible for lowering the flag of the Nguyễn dynasty (Empire of Vietnam) and hoisting the flag of the Việt Minh (Democratic Republic of Vietnam), Đặng Văn Việt and Nguyễn Thế Lương, later became prominent military officers in the People's Army of Vietnam.

Abdication document / Speech

According to Vietnam: Blood and Fire

According to Bảo Đại, Dragon of Vietnam

Edict directed at the imperial family of the Nguyễn dynasty  

Along with the "official abdication" (Chiếu thoái vị), Emperor Bảo Đại also issued another document (imperial edict) for the imperial family attached to it with the following text:

Symbolism

The ceremonial items after the reading of the Proclamation of Independence of the Democratic Republic of Vietnam in Hanoi 

Following the public reading of the Proclamation of Independence of the Democratic Republic of Vietnam on 2 September 1945 by Hồ Chí Minh The ceremonial items were brought the meeting room of its government in Hanoi. Nguyễn Hữu Đang asked of Trần Lê Nghĩa to prepare a table for Hồ Chí Minh and bring the seal and sword there. After the reading of the declaration of independence Hồ Chí Minh suddenly stood up, he quickly grabbed the sword and then leisurely walked over to the microphone, pulled the blade out of its sheath, and raised it as high as he could reach, shouting loudly and slowly causing vibrations across the entire space the words "This sword is meant to behead traitors." (Thanh kiếm này là để chặt đầu những tên phản quốc).

Transfer of the "Mandate of Heaven" to the Democratic Republic of Vietnam  

According to a paper written by Brian Michael Jenkins of the RAND Corporation in March 1972 entitled "Why the North Vietnamese will keep fighting" that distributed by the National Technical Information Service, an agency of the United States Department of Commerce, because of the transfer of the ceremonial seal and sword in 1945 the North Vietnamese believed that  they were in possession of the Mandate of Heaven while the supposedly Republic of Vietnam did not it. So Jenkins argued that the North Vietnamese and the Việt Cộng believed that they would be victorious in the Vietnam War because it was "Heaven's will" as only the government with the Mandate of Heaven was the legitimate ruler of the Vietnamese people. 

Brian Michael Jenkins wrote that he thinks that the senior leadership of North Vietnam (the Democratic Republic of Vietnam) and the Workers' Party of Vietnam believes this as many were the children of Nguyễn dynasty mandarins and were raised in a Confucian environment, rather than from the Proletariat which is why in his opinion the Communists often acted more Traditionalists than the South Vietnamese.  

 

Later Brian Michael Jenkins noted that regarding the Mandate of Heaven being transferred through the passing of the Hoàng Đế chi bảo seal and the Sword of the State presented a strong personal motivation for the Communist leadership to pursue victory over the Republic of Vietnam (South Vietnam) during the Vietnam War. In a later passage regarding the psychology of the Communist Vietnamese leadership Jenkins wrote:

 

This was cited as an important psychological reason why the Communists were so determined to keep on fighting and didn't give up during the Vietnam War when fighting the South Vietnamese and their allies (including the United States).

Transfer of Nguyễn dynasty treasures to the Democratic Republic of Vietnam  
 

Following the abolition of the Nguyễn dynasty in 1945 Emperor Bảo Đại handed over 3000 antiques (weighing around 800 kilograms) of antiques, including seals, from the Forbidden City and other royal palaces to the revolutionary government of the Democratic Republic of Vietnam following its declaration of independence. As the capital city moved from Huế to Hanoi these antiques were stored at the National Museum of Vietnamese History. At the time, only light and small items were selected to move to Hanoi, as heavy items, such as the throne, the Emperor’s palanquin, stone-made screen of the Minh Mạng Emperor, etc. were left in the city of Huế.

Following the transfer of the treasures from the government of the Nguyễn dynasty to the Democratic Republic of Vietnam, an official named Nguyễn Lân commented to Chairman Hồ Chí Minh "In the opinion of many people, it is necessary to melt all the gold and silver taken over from the Nguyễn dynasty to increase the budget to serve the resistance." (Theo ý kiến của nhiều người, cần nấu chảy toàn bộ số vàng bạc tiếp quản từ triều Nguyễn để tăng ngân lượng phục vụ kháng chiến). In response Hồ Chí Minh asked: "If one day we unify the entire country, what evidence will exist to confirm that we have a tradition of several thousand years of civilisation?" (Nếu một ngày nào đó thống nhất đất nước, chúng ta lấy bằng chứng gì để khẳng định chúng ta có truyền thống mấy ngàn năm văn hiến?). This decision ensured the preservation of Nguyễn dynasty treasures into the present day.

Return of the seal and sword to Bảo Đại and ceremony held in Hanoi on 8 March 1953 
 

On 28 February 1952 French General François Jean Antonin Gonzalez de Linarès announced that while digging soil to build a post in Nghĩa Đô in the outskirts of Hanoi, French soldiers saw a 20 liter barrel of kerosene made of iron, inside of this barrel was a gold seal and a broken sword. Ten days later, on 8 March 1952, a full three years after the Élysée Agreements, at the Ba Đình Square, Hanoi, French General François Jean Antonin Gonzalez de Linarès solemnly held a ceremony to hand over the seals and swords to the Chief of State Bảo Đại. The intent of the ceremony by the French was the symbolic return of the Emperor as "the Emperor left, the Emperor returned". Photographs of this event were published in the French magazine Paris Match. 

According to the concubine Mộng Điệp the French intended to hand the ceremonial items back to the Nguyễn dynasty on that day, but according to the accounts of Mộng Điệp Bảo Đại was on vacation in the West so he couldn't receive the items, in reality he was in Vietnam in 1953. So Lê Thanh Cảnh arranged to give the ceremonial items to Mộng Điệp in Buôn Mê Thuột, Darlac. Mộng Điệp ordered her servants to have the blade repaired and then sharpened to obfuscate where it was originally broken. 

When Bảo Đại returned Mộng Điệp said that she has the ceremonial items he gave to Trần Huy Liệu in 1945 and the story of how the French retrieved them. In response Bảo Đại exclaimed "Oh! That's right... In the old days these things went away and saved my life. Now suddenly they come back, maybe I'm about to die!" (Ờ! Đúng rồi... Ngày xưa những thứ nầy ra đi nó cứu mạng anh. Bây giờ tự nhiên nó lại về có lẽ mình sắp chết rồi!). Due to the ongoing war he didn't dare return the items to Huế and they were later brought to France.

Aftermath

Role of Bảo Đại in future Vietnamese politics

Supreme advisor to the government of the Democratic Republic of Vietnam  
 

Following his abdication former Emperor Bảo Đại accepted President Hồ Chí Minh's offer to become an advisor to the new Vietnamese government in Hanoi. Hồ Chí Minh gave him the title of Conseiller suprême du gouvernement (Supreme-councilor of the government), but Bảo Đại understood that this position was one that could have easily resulted in his death if he ever stepped out of line. In his memoirs Bảo Đại noted that the government of the Democratic Republic of Vietnam held weekly meetings that usually last from 09:00 to 13:00, he stated that during these meetings President Hồ Chí Minh just sits and watches others without speaking. He noted a time when Phạm Văn Đồng reported that after budgeting there were only three 25-cent coins left in the state fund. And in order to increase the money in the state's coffers, it is proposed that indirect taxes be imposed on consumable products such as chickens, ducks, and buffalo. Bảo Đại then said "Vous oubliez le chien." (You forgot about dogs), which made Hồ Chí Minh laugh. President Hồ Chí Minh hoped that he could make Bảo Đại into the "Souphanouvong of Vietnam" but failed. 

During the Chinese occupation of Northern Vietnam many nationalist political groups such as the Việt Nam Quốc Dân Đảng (Việt Quốc) and the Việt Nam Cách mệnh Đồng minh Hội (Việt Cách) called upon Bảo Đại to lead the country again he showed complete indifference to their proposals and instead indulged in the hedonistic pursuit of pleasure. When he went to Chongqing, Sichuan, China in a trip together with a number of Communist officers such as ms. Hà Phú Hương to secure weapons to fight the French he bluntly announced that he would stay to which his travel companions pointed out that he only cared for women and playing games. However in his memoirs Le Dragon d' Annam Bảo Đại claimed that he was instructed to stay in China while wanting to board a plane from Kunming, Yunnan, China when he received the following telegram: "Sire, everything is fine here, take your time. Besides, you will be very useful to us by staying in China.  Don't worry, as soon as it's time to come back, I'll let you know.  Rest well for the tasks ahead.  Brotherly kisses. Signed: Hồ Chí Minh." which contradicts the other account. As all of his clothes and documents were on the plane he remarked on Hồ Chí Minh being deceitful and was fortunate enough to meet a French-speaking Chinese man in Western clothes whom he met at the airport that allowed him to stay at his place after they bonded over both having studied in Paris. Bảo Đại stayed for months with his new friend and reported spent around six months in Chongqing where he met with notable Vietnamese politicians like Lưu Đức Trung, Phạm Văn Bính, Đinh Xuân Quảng, and Bùi Tường Chiểu.

On 15 September 1946 he decided to leave Chongqing for Hong Kong.

Chief of State of the State of Vietnam  

  

In order to combat the influence of the Democratic Republic of Vietnam and the Việt Minh the French were forced to grant more autonomy to the Vietnamese and French President Vincent Auriol arranged for the former Emperor Bảo Đại to return to Vietnam and lead a new autonomous Vietnamese state in what the French called the "Bảo Đại solution" (Giải pháp Bảo Đại). On 24 April 1949 Bảo Đại would return from France back to Vietnam. Nearly two months later, on 14 June 1949 Bảo Đại issued an ordinance giving him the position of "Chief of State of the State of Vietnam" (Quốc trưởng Quốc gia Việt Nam), in his memoirs he claimed that he did this to receive better recognition on an international level. Furthermore, in his memoirs he emphasised that his proper title was "Emperor, Chief of State" (Hoàng đế, Quốc trưởng). The position was supposed to only be temporary until Vietnam would have an elected constitutional parliament. 

In 1950 Bảo Đại was given the "Domain of the Crown" which included ethnic minority lands within Vietnam that were directly placed under his rule where remained to be the "Emperor". It was officially established on 15 April 1950 and dissolved on 11 March 1955.  

During his time as Chief of State he was often absent from most events in Vietnam and would frequently spend his time in Europe or in his domain, specifically in the resort towns of Đà Lạt, Nha Trang, and Buôn Ma Thuột, rather than attending to his responsibilities as the head of the government. 

Bảo Đại was ousted as the Chief of State of the State of Vietnam during a rigged referendum in 1955.

Fate of the Hoàng Đế chi bảo seal  
 

Following the French counteroffensive during the First Indochina War the government of Democratic Republic of Vietnam publicly buried the seal and the Sword of the State. The Hoàng Đế chi bảo seal remained buried and when Hanoi was given back to the North Vietnamese they dug the seal up and gave it to the National Museum of Vietnamese History. Later the Hoàng Đế chi bảo was stolen from the museum and it eventually ended up in the hands of concubine Mộng Điệp who intended to hand it, and the sword, back to Emperor Bảo Đại after he would return from France to Dalat. However, Bảo Đại ordered her to bring the regalia to France, where she gave it to Empress Nam Phương in 1953. In 1982 the Crown Prince Bảo Long handed the imperial seal back to his father, Bảo Đại. Since that time, there has been no word as to the whereabouts of the Hoàng Đế chi bảo seal.

Fate of the An dân bảo kiếm sword 

The An dân bảo kiếm blade is straight, it is designed as a typical French sword, but its hilt is decorated with the image of an imperial dragon, a typical Vietnamese decoration. The sword has an inscription on it which indicates that it was created during the reign of the Khải Định Emperor. 

Following the French counteroffensive during the First Indochina War the government of Democratic Republic of Vietnam publicly buried the seal and the Sword of the State. After carefully looking for the regalia the French later dug up the sword, which had been broken into three pieces, and then handed these pieces over to the Empress Dowager Từ Cung (the mother of Emperor Bảo Đại) who likely handed it over to the concubine Mộng Điệp.

The An dân bảo kiếm sword was on display at the Guimet National Museum of Asian Arts in 2015 at an exhibition entitled L’Envol du Dragon – Art royal du Vietnam' tức 'Thăng Long – Nghệ thuật Hoàng gia Việt Nam (Flight of the Dragon - Royal / Imperial art of Vietnam). At this exhibition the sword had the description "Bien que la forme de cette épée soit française, le décor associé des dragons aux motifs traditionnels du Vietnam impérial - 'Hình dạng của thanh kiếm này giống kiếm của người Pháp, nhưng cách trang trí chạm khắc hình rồng theo mô-típ truyền thống của hoàng gia Việt Nam" (Although the shape of this sword is French, the decorations of the sword feature dragons which are a traditional motif of Imperial Vietnam).

Controversies  

In a 4 September 2015 BBC article entitled Bảo Đại trao kiếm giả cho 'cách mạng'? (Did Bảo Đại give a fake sword to the "revolution"?), its author Phạm Cao Phong questioned if sword and seal handed over by Emperor Bảo Đại to the representatives of the Democratic Republic of Vietnam were authentic or even "the correct" state symbols of the Nguyễn dynasty.

Perception of the Việt Minh by the Nguyễn dynasty 

In his article Phạm Cao Phong noted how just before the abdication both Bảo Đại and those around him were unaware of the Provisional Revolutionary Government of the Democratic Republic of Vietnam (Chính phủ Cách mạng lâm thời Việt Nam Dân chủ Cộng hòa) and the people behind it. After the demands for his abdication were made Emperor Bảo Đại inquired into the demanders but wasn't able to find much information about the Democratic Republic of Vietnam and their government. 

Briefly before the ceremony Phạm Khắc Hoè met up with Trần Huy Liệu, one of the delegates of the government of the Democratic Republic of Vietnam, on 28 August 1945. According to the memoires of Phạm Khắc Hoè, "Từ triều đình Huế đến chiến khu Việt Bắc" (From the Court of Huế to the Việt Bắc war zone), he was unimpressed by both Liệu and the delegation. As Hoè was the only one with access to the most important items in the imperial palace Phạm Cao Phong argues that this might have given him a motivation to deliberately wish to not provide real objects during the handover ceremony. 

Phạm Cao Phong noted that at the time the 30 year old Emperor Bảo Đại was known to be both a hunter and playboy as well as a professional gambler that treated both animals and girls as prey. He used this in analogy that Bảo Đại likely perceived the delegates of the Democratic Republic of Vietnam as "his prey" (con mồi). On 25 August 1945 Bảo Đại met with the delegates and embarrassed them multiple times causing them to deliberate together on multiple occasions. Emperor Bảo Đại spoke of Trần Huy Liệu, the head of the delegation and vice chairman of the Committee, as being "a skinny man that looked pathetic, wearing dark glasses to hide his squinting eyes (Một người gầy gò trông rất thảm hại, đeo kính đen để giấu cặp mắt lé). Furthermore, he described Cù Huy Cận as looking" too trivial" (tầm thường) and stated that he felt disappointed by the receivers of his abdication.

In his memoirs Phạm Khắc Hoè mentions that briefly before the abdication ceremony Emperor Bảo Đại said "ça vaut bien le coup alors" (Well worth it then) to him, describing it as a profitable gamble.

Status of the seal transferred during the ceremony  

Phạm Cao Phong noted that many contradictory sources exist on which items (sword and seal) were transferred on 30 August 1945, such as reports by Phạm Khắc Hòe, Trần Huy Liệu, Cù Huy Cận, Nguyễn Hữu Đang, the concubine Mộng Điệp, as well as the published documents of the French about the event.

Accordint to the story of French General François Jean Antonin Gonzalez de Linares, he announced that the gold seal and Sword of the State were found on 28 February 1953 at Nghĩa Đô where French soldiers dug for fortifications near the temple. Gonzalez de Linares then noted that he handed them over to the Bảo Đại government on 8 March 1952 as a form of psychological warfare against the Việt Minh as the transfer of these files to the DRV was seen as "Heaven's will". Phạm Cao Phòng questioned why French soldiers were even digging fortifications at that time and at that location and wondered why the French were preparing for Việt Minh tanks in such an unlikely location. Phạm Cao Phong also criticised the lack of an appraisal record to confirm that the Hoàng Đế chi bảo seal was real or fake, as well as Bảo Đại's absence on the day the French returned these objects. Following the return of the ceremonial objects to Bảo Đại the French said "The Nguyễn dynasty goes, the Nguyễn dynasty returns" (Nguyễn đi rồi Nguyễn lại về). 

Phạm Cao Phong claimed that the more convincing evidence of the Hoàng Đế chi bảo seal not really being the most valuable seal of the Nguyễn dynasty being a psychological blow against the Democratic Republic of Vietnam as Phạm Cao Phong claimed that the most precious seal of the nation was the Đại việt quốc Nguyễn Vĩnh Trấn chi bảo (大越國阮主永鎮之寶, "Seal of the eternal government of the Nguyễn Lords of the kingdom of Great(er) Viêt") originally created on 6 December 1709 under Lord Nguyễn Phúc Chu, which was named as the most precious family heirloom seal by Emperor Gia Long when he founded the Nguyễn dynasty back in 1802. 

Phạm Cao Phong noted how the Hoàng Đế chi bảo seal was one the two seals of the Nguyễn that was lost alongside the Trấn thủ tướng quân chi ấn (鎮守將軍之印, "Seal of the guardian general.") seal, and noted that its most valuable "family heirloom seal", the Đại việt quốc Nguyễn Vĩnh Trấn chi bảo seal, was handed over by Emperor Bảo Đại to the government of the Democratic Republic of Vietnam outside of the ceremony. He claimed that it would have made more sense if this seal was handed over at the ceremony because of its symbolic significance as no other seal is qualified as legal value as well as the historical age and orthodox documents of the Nguyễn dynasty as the Đại việt quốc Nguyễn Vĩnh Trấn chi bảo seal for the transfer of the throne, especially since Emperor Gia Long said that this seal should "forever be the symbol of the power of the Nguyễn dynasty throne and that his descendants must forever guard it, not lose it, and preserve the memory of the seal and what it stood for, for years and a long time" (Từ nay về sau nên lấy ấn này làm vật báu truyền ngôi. Con cháu ta phải đời đời để lại cho nhau, đừng làm mất đi mà truyền đến ức muôn năm dài lâu mãi mãi). But noted that the theory that Bảo Đại only gave fake symbols to the Democratic Republic of Vietnam would make less sense as the real  Đại việt quốc Nguyễn Vĩnh Trấn chi bảo seal is now in the hands of the Communist government.

But that's why according to Phạm Cao Phong the story of the transfer ceremony becomes troublesome. Phạm Cao Phong noted that the Đại việt quốc Nguyễn Vĩnh Trấn chi bảo seal wasn't "a witness" at all at the transfer of power ceremony during the abdication of Bảo Đại which "completely changed the flow of the history of Vietnam 70 years ago" (Dòng chảy lịch sử đất Việt chuyển dòng cách đây đúng 70 năm). Phạm Cao Phong noted that not a single person directly or indirectly involved in this event reached out to bring this unique witness to the abdication ceremony. He noted that the absence of the Đại việt quốc Nguyễn Vĩnh Trấn chi bảo seal during the abdication ceremony of Bảo Đại may have been an indication of "a dishonest transfer of the throne" (Nghĩa với việc chuyển giao ngai vàng là không thành thật). Furthermore, he noted that the presence of a rusty sword reinforces that statement.

Identity of the seal transferred during the ceremony 

Most accounts of the events name the Hoàng Đế chi bảo (皇帝之寶)  seal as being the seal that Emperor Bảo Đại personally handed over to the representatives of the Provisional Revolutionary Government of the Democratic Republic of Vietnam on 30 August 1945. However, according to the Memoires of Nguyễn Hữu Đang (Hồi ký Nguyễn Hữu Đang) the seal was in fact the Nguyễn lords period Quốc Vương chi ấn (國王之印, "Seal of the King of the nation") which was created during the reign of Lord Nguyễn Phúc Khoát in 1744.

The weight of the seal has also been disputed by various accounts giving vastly different weights of the seal. According to Phạm Khắc Hoè it had a weight of 10 kilograms and was made of pure gold, Trần Huy Liệu claimed that it weighed only 7 kg, while Nguyễn Hữu Đang claimed that the seal weighed around 5 kg. 

Meanwhile the concubine Mộng Điệp claimed that when she held the seal after it was handed over to her by the French weighed 12.9 kilograms. Furthermore, she described the seal as having a dragon-shaped knob. The dragon on the knob was said to be arched with its head raised and was described as "not very sharp", the dragon is studded with two red pearls.

Status of the sword transferred during the ceremony  

Phạm Cao Phong noted that the Nguyễn dynasty (and earlier Nguyễn lords) were known for being especially cruel during their reigns, such as Nguyễn Văn Thành, a Tây Sơn Rebellion war hero that was responsible for severe victories for the Nguyễn dynasty being executed for two lines in a poem by his son in 1815, Gia Long had the son executed. Phan Châu Trinh records that the emperor had also had Thành himself and Thành's elderly father executed. In effect this was the case, as Thành was driven to take his own life. Furthermore, Phạm Cao Phong stated that he believed that it was unlikely for servants to let the "butcher's sword" (Gươm đồ tể), a reference to cruelty of the Nguyễn dynasty, rust as it was a worship object in the imperial palace and servants were recruited to protect all objects in the imperial palace from even dust. Phạm Cao Phong wondered why a sword in the possession of the Nguyễn dynasty with such high symbolic value would even be subject to the level of negligence that would let it be subject to oxidation. 

Phạm Khắc Hoè, who did the inventorisation of the family heirlooms of the Nguyễn dynasty wrote in January 1945 regarding the status of all ceremonial items in the palace: 

 

As a second point in his article Phạm Cao Phong noted that the art of creating swords during the Nguyễn dynasty period had reached its zenith and Vietnamese swords during this period were of the highest quality, as an example he cited the fact that on 5 July 1885 the French seized a sword once owned by Emperor Gia Long which is now on display at the Hôtel des Invalides in Paris still looks new despite its age. So Phạm Cao Phong wondered how such a relatively new sword in the hands of such a cruel dynasty that took good care of its possessions would be in such a bad state. He concluded that the sword Bảo Đại handed over to the Democratic Republic of Vietnam must have been a fake sword. 

In his memoires, Cù Huy Cận wrote that after receiving the Sword of the State he admired the gilded exterior of the sword but was curious to the blade itself which appeared to have suffered from oxidation, this made him comment on the rusty state of the sword in a microphone which made the crowd laugh and got a chuckle out of Emperor Bảo Đại. 

Phạm Cao Phong noted that it is possible that Phạm Khắc Hòe quickly commissioned the creation of a fake sword after meeting Trần Huy Liệu on 28 August 1945 and being unimpressed with the government of the Democratic Republic of Vietnam.

In the Memoires of Nguyễn Hữu Đang (Hồi ký Nguyễn Hữu Đang), Nguyễn Hữu Đang described the blade as being gold. Of its three sheaths, the widest was two inches thick and it contains sharp claws like rice leaves. The sheaths are carved meticulously describing the hand of the craftsman as the quintessence of fine art work. Nguyễn Hữu Đang described the blade as coming from fairy tale.

According to the contradictory reports, the rusty sword in Cù Huy Cận's hand on 30 August 1945 turned into a golden sword in Nguyễn Hữu Đang's hands within a period of only three days. Mr. Trần Huy Liệu stated that he had submitted the sword, alongside the seal, to Hồ Chí Minh and the Standing Central Committee of the Democratic Republic of Vietnam. Phạm Cao Phong believes that there is a possibility that the government of the Democratic Republic of Vietnam found out that this sword was a fake and got another sword instead, as he stated that "Rusty gold is fake gold" (Vàng gỉ là vàng giả).

Misreporting on the transfer ceremony by the Vietnam Military History Museum 

In 2020 the Vietnam Military History Museum, Hanoi opened the exhibition "The August Revolution - Historical Milestone" (Cách mạng tháng Tám - Mốc son lịch sử) with more than 300 documents, images and artifacts about the August Revolution leading to the establishment of the Democratic Republic of Vietnam. Several photographs at the exhibition depicted soldiers in French-style uniforms holding the ceremonial items of the abdication, these photographs have descriptions that allude to them being of the abdication ceremony, but Cù Huy Hà Vũ in his Voice of America article Kỳ án ấn và kiếm tại lễ thoái vị của vua Bảo Đại - Kỳ 1 (The seal and sword at the abdication ceremony of Sovereign Bảo Đại - Part 1) noted that these soldiers couldn't have been Nguyễn dynasty soldiers as their uniforms didn't match the Nguyễn dynasty military uniforms of the Bảo Đại period. Furthermore, he noted that the background clearly shows the Ba Đình Square in Hanoi as opposed to Huế where the abdication ceremony took place. 

He concluded that these photographs were indeed from a French colonial ceremony held in 1952 symbolising the return of Emperor Bảo Đại rather than his abdication.

Notes

References

Sources  

  Translated from Le dragon d'Annam, Bao Dai, Plon, 1980. (in French).
 
 Nghiêm Kế Tổ - Vietnam: Blood & Fire (Việt Nam Máu Lửa). Publisher: Mai Lĩnh Publishing House. Published : 1954. (in Vietnamese).

External links  
 

Nguyen dynasty 
1945 in French Indochina
1945 in Vietnam
Abdication 
Politics of World War II 
Political history of Vietnam 
August 1945 events in Asia